William M. Cockrum House, also known as Cockrum Hall, is a historic home located at Oakland City, Gibson County, Indiana.  It was built in 1876, and is a two-story, Italian Villa style brick dwelling with a one-story wing. It features a three-story square corner tower set at a 45 degree angle, round and segmental arched windows, and bracketed cornice.

It was listed on the National Register of Historic Places in 1978.

References

Houses on the National Register of Historic Places in Indiana
Italianate architecture in Indiana
Houses completed in 1876
Buildings and structures in Gibson County, Indiana
National Register of Historic Places in Gibson County, Indiana